Gobenowsee is a lake in the Mecklenburgische Seenplatte district in Mecklenburg-Vorpommern, Germany. It is at an elevation of 57.5 m, and its surface area is 1.35 km².

Lakes of Mecklenburg-Western Pomerania
LGobenowsee